Kevin Kühnert (born 1 July 1989) is a German politician and the General Secretary of the Social Democratic Party of Germany (SPD) who has been serving as a member of the Bundestag since the 2021 elections, representing Berlin-Tempelhof-Schöneberg.

From 24 November 2017 to 8 January 2021 Kühnert was the federal chairman of the Jusos, previously serving as deputy chairman.

Early life and career 
Kühnert was born in West Berlin. His father is a tax clerk, and his mother works in a job centre. He was named after the footballer Kevin Keegan. He passed his final exam at the Beethoven-Gymnasium in Lankwitz in 2008, where he also served as pupil's spokesman. He then completed a voluntary social year (German: Freiwilliges Soziales Jahr) in a Berlin-based organization for children and young people.

Kühnert initially worked over three years in a call center, then studying journalism and communication science at the Free University of Berlin, but never graduated. In 2016, he enrolled for a degree in political science at the University of Hagen, but suspended studies after becoming Juso chairman. In 2014, he began working in the Abgeordnetenhaus of Berlin, first for Dilek Kolat, then Melanie Kühnemann.

Political career

Early beginnings 
Kühnert joined the SPD in 2005 and chaired the Jusos in Berlin from 2012 to 2015. Since 2015, he acted as deputy Jusos Federal Chairman and was responsible for tax policy, pension policy, structural policy, right-wing extremism, and migration policy, as well as social media work.

Chair of the Young Socialists, 2017–2021 
When Johanna Uekermann did not run as a candidate again, in November 2017, the Juso federal congress in Saarbrücken elected Kühnert as chairman, with 225 of 297 votes. In terms of local politics, Kühnert is active in the district of Tempelhof-Schöneberg as a member of the district council.

During the campaign for the SPD party member vote on the 2018 coalition agreement of Germany, Kühnert, along with the #NoGroKo (No Grand Coalition) initiative, promoted the No campaign. At a SPD national convention in 2019, he was elected as one of the five deputies of the party's co-chairs Saskia Esken and Norbert Walter-Borjans, alongside Klara Geywitz, Hubertus Heil, Serpil Midyatli and Anke Rehlinger. He had previously endorsed Esken and Walter-Borjans in their successful bid for the leadership of the party in 2019.

In an August 2020 interview with Der Tagesspiegel Kühnert announced that he would step down as chair of the Jusos, saying that the "time was right" for new leadership in advance of an anticipated 2021 German federal election. After Kühnert resigned from the office early because of his candidacy for the Bundestag, Jessica Rosenthal was elected to succeed him on 8 January 2021, with 207 of 266 votes.

Member of the German Parliament, 2021–present 
On 16 December 2020, Kühnert was nominated as a direct candidate in the Berlin constituency of Tempelhof-Schöneberg in the 2021 federal election.

In the negotiations to form a so-called traffic light coalition of the SPD, the Green Party and the FDP following the 2021 federal elections, Kühnert led his party's delegation in the working group on housing and construction; his co-chairs from the other parties were Christian Kühn and Daniel Föst.

Other activities 
 spw – Zeitschrift für sozialistische Politik und Wirtschaft, Member of the Editorial Board
 Education and Science Workers' Union (GEW), member
 Willy Brandt Center Jerusalem (WBC), member
 German Youth Hostel Association (DJH), member
 Tennis Borussia Berlin, Member of the supervisory board (2013–2017)

Political positions

Economic policy
In an interview with German newspaper Die Zeit in May 2019, Kühnert described himself as being a democratic socialist, promoting the municipalization of large firms and the expropriation of owners from companies like BMW and people who own more than one house or apartment. In his opinion, real democratic socialism has never been tried.

Foreign policy
In early 2022 – amid renewed military confrontations between Russia and Ukraine and anti-government protests in Kazakhstan – Kühnert argued that the Nord Stream 2 pipeline to bring Russian gas to Germany should not be mixed up with political and human rights disputes with Russia.

Recognition 
In May 2018, Kühnert was chosen as a "Next Generation Leader" by Time because of the resistance he launched against the grand coalition that nearly managed to topple Chancellor Angela Merkel and led to a national debate about the future of the SPD and the future of German politics in general. In August 2020 he was described as "a rising star on the left" in Germany by The Guardian.

Personal life 
In March 2018, Kühnert came out as gay in an interview with the magazine Siegessäule.

References 

1989 births
Living people
Politicians from Berlin
Social Democratic Party of Germany politicians
LGBT members of the Bundestag
German LGBT politicians
Gay politicians
Free University of Berlin alumni
21st-century German politicians
University of Hagen alumni
European democratic socialists
Members of the Bundestag 2021–2025
Members of the Bundestag for Berlin